The NorthCap University (NCU), formerly ITM University, is a private university situated in Sector 23-A, Gurgaon, Haryana, India. It was founded in 1996 by Educate India Society, registered under the Registration of Societies Act of 1860 as an Engineering Institute, to provide education in Technical and Management. Formerly it was under Maharshi Dayanand University, Rohtak.

The Institute gained the status of private university in the Academic Year 2009–10, and was renamed ITM University.

Campus

The university is located in Sector 23-A, Gurgaon, Haryana, which is about 15 km  from Indira Gandhi International Airport. The university's campus is spread over 10 acres with a covered area of over 32,000 square metres.

Schools
The university has four schools offering courses at the undergraduate, graduate and doctoral level, namely the School of Engineering & Technology, School of Management, School of Law and School of Professional Attachment, as well as a Centre for Languages Learning.

School of Engineering and Technology
Department of Applied Sciences
Department of Civil and Environmental Engineering
Department of Computer Science and Engineering
Department of Electrical, Electronics and Communication Engineering
Department of Mechanical Engineering
School of Management and Liberal Studies
School of Law
School of Professional Attachment
Centre for Languages Learning

Rankings

The National Institutional Ranking Framework (NIRF) ranked it 97 among engineering colleges in 2021.

See also
 State University of Performing And Visual Arts
 State Institute of Film and Television

References

External links
 

1986 establishments in Haryana
Educational institutions established in 1996
Technical universities and colleges in India
Universities in Haryana